Beech is an unincorporated community in Wayne County in the U.S. state of Michigan. The community is located within Redford Charter Township. As an unincorporated community, Beech has no legally defined boundaries or population statistics of its own.

The community was given a post office under the name Beech on December 4, 1871 with Albert Fisher serving as the first postmaster.  Beech was platted in 1872 and was also known by the name Fisher.  It had a general store operated by Albert Fisher and a sawmill operated by Dunning, Fisher & Rhode.  It was also known as Fishers Station after the railroad depot.  The early village of Redford was also platted in 1872.  The post office was absorbed into Detroit and closed on September 17, 1906.  Today, the community of Beech is part of Redford Township, and the name is retained locally in Beech Road.

References

Redford, Michigan
Unincorporated communities in Michigan
Unincorporated communities in Wayne County, Michigan
Populated places established in 1871
1871 establishments in Michigan